The 1966 Maryland Terrapins football team represented the University of Maryland in the 1966 NCAA University Division football season. In their first and only season under head coach Lou Saban, the Terrapins compiled a 4–6 record (3–3 in conference), finished in a tie for third place in the Atlantic Coast Conference, and were outscored by their opponents 204 to 180. The team's statistical leaders included Alan Pastrana with 1,499 passing yards, Billy Lovett with 451 rushing yards, and Billy Van Heusen with 536 receiving yards.

Schedule

Roster

References

Maryland
Maryland Terrapins football seasons
Maryland Terrapins football